The 1868 United States presidential election in Maine took place on November 3, 1868, as part of the 1868 United States presidential election. Voters chose seven representatives, or electors to the Electoral College, who voted for president and vice president.

Maine voted for the Republican nominee, Ulysses S. Grant, over the Democratic nominee, Horatio Seymour. Grant won the state by a margin of 24.82%.

Results

See also
 United States presidential elections in Maine

References

Maine
1868
1868 Maine elections